The Horace Duncan House (also known as the Herlong House) is a historic site in Lake City, Florida, United States. It is located at 202 West Duval Street. On November 15, 1993, it was added to the U.S. National Register of Historic Places.

References

External links 
 Columbia County listings, Florida's Office of Cultural and Historical Programs

Houses in Columbia County, Florida
Houses on the National Register of Historic Places in Florida
Lake City, Florida
National Register of Historic Places in Columbia County, Florida
1907 establishments in Florida